Thomas Logan Hicks (born December 18, 1952) is a former American professional football player who played linebacker for five seasons for the Chicago Bears of the National Football League (NFL), from 1976 to 1980. His jersey number was 54.

During the 1978 NFL season, Hicks suffered a knee injury in Week 10 in a contest against the Seattle Seahawks. He was diagnosed with torn knee ligaments and underwent surgery that evening after the game. He missed the remainder of the 1978 NFL season.

After a breakdown in contract negotiations for the 1981 season, Hicks retired.

Hicks played college football for Illinois.

Hicks was an all-state linebacker at Willowbrook High School in Villa Park, IL (Class of 1971).

References

1952 births
Living people
Players of American football from Chicago
American football linebackers
Illinois Fighting Illini football players
Chicago Bears players